Bagtyyarlyk District is a borough of Ashgabat, Turkmenistan. As a borough, it is headed by a presidentially appointed mayor. 

Boundaries of Bagtyýarlyk District in OpenStreetMap

Etymology
The Turkmen word bagtyýar means "happy, fortunate". The Turkic suffix -lyk denotes "state of being", hence "happiness, enjoying good fortune".

Places of interest
Ashgabat International Airport

References

See also
 Ashgabat
 Districts of Turkmenistan

Districts of Turkmenistan